ishop TV is an Australian free-to-air television channel and a digital advertorial datacasting service that was launched on 30 April 2013. The channel is owned by Seven West Media (formerly Prime Media Group) and Brand Developers, broadcasting infomercials and home shopping.

When sister channel 4ME on channel 64 was closed after its operator Brand New Media went into administration, channel 64 was re-purposed as a feed of ishop TV. The extra feed was later removed in June 2016. This channel broadcast on channel 65 from its launch until the last day of November 2022, when it was moved to channel 67 to fit 7Bravo on channel 65. It is only available in Seven regional areas excluding Southern Cross Austereo/WIN Corporation affiliates and Regional QLD and also not Seven metro areas.

See also

 List of digital television channels in Australia
 Seven West Media
 7 Regional
 4ME

References

Prime Media Group
Seven Network
Digital terrestrial television in Australia
Television channels and stations established in 2013
English-language television stations in Australia
Home shopping television stations in Australia